Gary Stanislawski (born 1959) is an American politician who served as a member of the Oklahoma Senate from 2008 to 2021.

Background 
Stanislawski earned a bachelor's degree from Oregon State University and a master's degree from Oral Roberts University. He has been a small business owner. He was a school board member for eight years before being elected to the state senate.

Sources
Stanislawski's campaign bio
Oklahoma Senate bio of Stanislawski
Business bio

1959 births
Living people
Oregon State University alumni
Oral Roberts University alumni
Republican Party Oklahoma state senators
Place of birth missing (living people)
21st-century American politicians